Wien Air Alaska (IATA:  WC) was a United States airline that was the result of a merger of Northern Consolidated Airlines (NCA) and Wien Alaska Airways. It initially used the name Wien Consolidated Airlines following the merger in 1968. The company was famous for being the first airline in Alaska, and one of the first in the United States. It ceased operations on 23 November 1984, at which point it was operating as Wien Airlines.

History
Noel Wien flew an open-cockpit biplane, a Hisso Standard J1 from Anchorage, Alaska's "Park Strip" to Fairbanks, Alaska on 6 July 1924 for Alaska Aerial Transportation Company.

In 1925, Wien purchased a Fokker F.III monoplane with a cabin built in 1921 in Amsterdam for the Fairbanks Airplane Company, and it was shipped to Seward, Alaska, by boat, then shipped in pieces via the Alaska Railroad to Fairbanks. Ralph Wien, Noel's brother, came with him, to work as a mechanic. They assembled the Fokker F.III Monoplane in Fairbanks.  Yet, Noel and Ralph quit the company in Nov. 1925.

Noel and Ralph Wien went into partnership with Gene Miller, and purchased a very used Hisso Standard from the Fairbanks Airplane Co. in 1927.  In June they established their business in Nome, servicing Candle, Deering, Kotzebue, and Point Hope.  At the end of the summer of 1927, Noel went into business for himself, purchasing a Stinson Detroiter he could fly year round, from Hubert Wilkins.  Noel, and his Wien Alaska Airways, started a regular weekly round trip flight between Fairbanks and Nome.  Noel also secured special air mail flights during the spring and fall breakup.

On 20 Oct. 1928, Wien Alaska Airways, Inc. was incorporated with Noel as president, Ralph as vice-president, and Miners and Merchants Bank president Granville (Grant) R. Jackson as secretary.  The new company built a hangar at Weeks Field and promptly ordered a Hamilton Metalplane.

Noel taught Ralph how to fly in 1924. Ralph was killed on October 12, 1930, while flying a diesel-powered Bellanca Bush plane with Fr. Philip Dolen, Superior general of Alaskan Catholic missions, and Fr. William Walsh, a diocesan priest from Oakland, California, on board.

In 1929, Noel, Ralph and Grant Jackson sold Wien Alaska Airways to Avco.  Noel's company plus Anchorage Air Transport and Bennett-Rodebaugh Company were merged into a new company called Alaskan Airways Inc.  Noel flew for Alaskan Airways from Feb. 1931 until Jan. 1932.  In Aug. 1932, once his non-compete clause ended, Noel restarted Wien Airways of Alaska, Inc.  Northern Air Transport of Nome merged with Wien in 1936.  In 1936, Wien had the first air-to-ground radio links in Alaska, and by 1937, Noel had 3 other pilots flying Wien's 8 aircraft, and 3 other mechanics worked with Sigurd Wien, his brother, while 3 people administered their offices in Fairbanks and Nome.

Sig received his commercial rating in 1937. Sig managed the Nome Office and flew the North Slope bush flights. Sig Wien, as a bush pilot, flew contracts for USGS geologic exploration activities including geologist Marvin Mangus.

Noel Wien was forced to sell his shares to Sig in 1940, so Noel could pay for his wife's medical care.  He returned as a vice-president and continued to fly for the airline into the 1950s.  Noel then worked public relations for the company into the 1970s.

Northern Consolidated Airlines (NCA) was formed on 8 May 1947 with Ray Petersen as president.  The company was an amalgamation of Ray Petersen Flying Service, Northern Airways, Walatka Air Service, and Northern Air Service.  Ray Petersen had started Ray Petersen Flying Service in 1937, based in Bethel, Alaska, supporting the platinum mining operations in Platinum, Alaska.  In 1941, Ray moved his headquarters to Anchorage, and in 1943, he purchased Bristol Bay Air Service and Jim Dodson Air Service. After WWII, NCA purchased several war surplus Douglas DC3s.

The front cover of the September 16, 1968 Wien system timetable stated, "Alaska's First Airline with America's Newest Jet the 737".  This timetable listed Boeing 737-200 jet service being operated on the following routes:  Anchorage-Fairbanks, Anchorage-King Salmon, Fairbanks-Barrow and Fairbanks-Galena-Nome-Fairbanks with the latter being a "triangle" routing. On December 6 of the same year it received the first 737 certified by Boeing with the gravel kit.

Also in 1968, Wien merged with Northern Consolidated Airlines (NCA).  Sig was named chairman, Ray Petersen president, and Noel and Fritz board members.  The new company was called Wien Consolidated Airlines until August 1, 1973, when the company name became Wien Air Alaska.  Sig retired and Ray assumed the roles of chairman, president and CEO.  By then the airline had more than 800 employees and five Boeing 737-200 jets as well as various turboprop and prop aircraft including Fairchild F-27s, Fairchild Hiller FH-227s, de Havilland Canada DHC-6 Twin Otters, Grumman Mallards, Pilatus Porters, and Short Skyvans.  Ray stepped down as president in 1976.

Expansion came at a price, as Wien was pushed to the brink of bankruptcy. Household Finance, controlling owners since 1979, then dumped its investment in the airline and sold the company to Wien's President, Jim J. Flood, in 1983. He shut down the airline, and on November 23, 1984, Wien was liquidated for profit. Noel's son, Merrill, said the end of his family's airline came when it "was bought by a corporate raider on a leveraged buyout and was liquidated for about twice what the stock was selling for. The Airline Deregulation Act of 1978 made this possible." in an interview with Avweb.[2]

Before Wien Air folded in 1985, they were known as the second-oldest airline in the United States.

The company pioneered jet service to gravel runways , and helped develop the Boeing 737-200 Combi aircraft configuration which allowed mixed freight and passenger loads on the main deck of the aircraft. By the spring of 1984, the Wien route network extended from Point Barrow in north to dozens of Alaskan communities as well as to cities in the lower 48 states in the western U.S. including Albuquerque, (ABQ), Boise (BOI), Denver (DEN), Phoenix (PHX), Oakland (OAK), Reno (RNO) and Salt Lake City (SLC).  Their main bases were located in Anchorage and Seattle.

According to the Official Airline Guide (OAG), Wien was operating interchange passenger service in conjunction with Pan American World Airways (Pan Am) with Boeing 727-100 jetliners in the fall of 1981 between Alaska and destinations in the lower 48 states.  The OAG lists these no change of plane through flights to Alaska operating a routing of Miami (MIA) - New Orleans (MSY) - Houston (IAH) - Seattle (SEA) - Anchorage (ANC) and from Alaska on a routing of Anchorage - Seattle - Houston - New Orleans with Wien flight crews operating the service between Anchorage and Seattle and Pan Am flight crews operating the Houston, New Orleans and Miami service with Seattle being the interchange point (also known as a "transport hub") between the two airlines.

Noel Wien's sons flew in an open cockpit biplane from Anchorage's 'Park Strip' to Fairbanks on the 75th anniversary of their father's flight. The municipality of Anchorage and the FAA allowed the plane to take off from the grass park, which was used as a runway in 1924.

Timeline
 1924 – 1926	Northern Air Transport
 1926 – 1935	Wien Airways of Alaska
 1935 – 1968	Wien Alaska Airlines 
 1968 – 1973	Wien Consolidated Airlines
 1973 – 1984	Wien Air Alaska
 1982 – 1984	Wien
 September 1984- November 1984    Wien Airlines

Destinations

Destinations in 1984 
By March 1984, Wien Air Alaska had expanded its scheduled passenger flights into the western U.S. in addition to continuing to serve many destinations in Alaska.  All of the cities in the lower 48 states were served with Boeing 727-200 and/or Boeing 737-200 jetliners at this time.  Some smaller destinations in Alaska were served with commuter turboprop aircraft. The following destination information is taken from the March 2, 1984 Wien Air Alaska system timetable route map.

 Albuquerque, NM (ABQ)
 Anchorage,  AK (ANC)
 Aniak, AK (ANI)
 Barrow, AK (BRW)
 Bethel, AK (BET)
 Boise, ID (BOI)
 Cordova, AK (CDV)
 Denver, CO (DEN)
 Dillingham, AK (DLG)
 Fairbanks, AK (FAI)
 Galena, AK (GAL)
 Homer, AK (HOM)
 Kenai, AK (ENA)
 King Salmon, AK (AKN)
 Kodiak, AK (ADQ)
 Kotzebue, AK (OTZ)
 McGrath, AK (MCG)
 Nome, AK (OME)
 Oakland, CA (OAK)
 Phoenix, AZ (PHX)
 Portland, OR (PDX)
 Prudhoe Bay, AK (SCC)
 Reno, NV (RNO)
 St. Mary's, AK (KSM)
 Salt Lake City, UT (SLC)
 Seattle, WA (SEA)
 Unalakleet, AK (UNK)
 Valdez, AK (VDZ)

Wien previously served Juneau (JNU) and Ketchikan (KTN) in Alaska as well as Whitehorse (YXY) in the Yukon Territory of Canada with Boeing 737-200 jet aircraft.

Fleet
Throughout its existence, Wien Air Alaska has operated many types of aircraft, with majority of its fleet being propeller driven. This is a complete list of all aircraft types ever operated by the airline:

Boeing 727s 
Wien Air Alaska had purchased several Boeing 727-100 Combis in 1981 to provide extra capacity for its routes, which by then extended well into the lower 48 states.  At the end of 1983, about a year before it folded, it acquired three of Ansett Australia's oldest 727-200s. By the end of 1984, the president of Wien Air Alaska, Jim J. Flood, attempted to restructure the company as Wien Airlines, which was shown on the September 1984 timetable.   The three Australian 727-200s were leased, at that time, to Republic Airlines (and later to the resurrected Braniff Airways after Republic's merger with Northwest Orient in 1986).   In the event Wien Airlines did not emerge as a passenger service and was probably a "paper company" merely to handle the leases of the former Wien Air Alaska fleet.  Wien Air Alaska ceased to function as an airline on, 23 November 1984 after 60 years of flying.  On November 28, 1984 Wien Air Alaska began bankruptcy proceedings and finally folded on October 25, 1985.

Boeing 737-200s 
In 1968 Wien merged with Northern Consolidated Airlines (NCA) and became known as Wien Consolidated Airlines until August 1, 1973 when the company name was changed to Wien Air Alaska.

Wien was the launch customer for the Boeing 737-200 Combi aircraft passenger/freighter, and one of the first U.S. operators to commence operations in May 1968 with aircraft N461GB. These aircraft were equipped with a large cargo door on the side of the fuselage just aft of the flight deck near the nose of the 737.    

The company pioneered jet service to gravel runways, and helped develop the Boeing 737-200 Combi aircraft configuration which allowed mixed freight and passenger loads on the main deck of the aircraft.

One former Wien aircraft (N4952W) was later acquired by First Air, an Arctic Northern Canadian airline, which then crashed operating as First Air Flight 6560 (C-GNWN) at Resolute Airport in the high Arctic region of Canada.  Other primary users of the Boeing 737-200 Combi version in Alaska were Alaska Airlines and MarkAir.

Incidents and accidents 
December 2, 1968 – Flight 55: Fairchild F-27B crashed into Spotsy Lake, Pedro Bay, Alaska; all 39 people on board were killed.
August 30, 1975 – Flight 99: Fairchild F-27B crashed on approach to Gambell, Alaska; 10 of the 32 passengers and crew on board were killed.

See also
Russel Merrill
List of defunct airlines of the United States

References

Ira B. Harkey Jr., Noel Wien - Pioneer Alaska Bush Pilot, and discussions in 2005 with Merrill and Richard Wien, sons of the founder.
 Merrill Wien interview, by Joe Godfrey Avweb 2002
 Wien Airlines, a good example of how to bankrupt a company by Charlie Dexter, U. of Alaska, Fairbanks
CHAPTER FOUR - The Wien Brothers The Last of the Bush Pilots (Mass Market Paperback - Bantam Air and Space Series)
by Harmon Helmericks, copyright 1969, pages 43 to 58

External links

Wien television commercials
KentWien.com – Founder's grandson has a few bits of Wien nostalgia on his site
Wien N-number fleet lists by time period
Timetable Images.com - Wien Air Alaska
Air Times.com - Wien Air Alaska

 
1927 establishments in Alaska
1985 disestablishments in Alaska
Airlines disestablished in 1985
Airlines established in 1927
Airlines based in Alaska